Fani Papageorgiou (born 1975 in Athens, Greece) is a poet and critic.

Background and education
Fani Papageorgiou is a graduate of Harvard University, the University of Edinburgh and Athens College.

Books
 When You Said No, Did You Mean Never? poetry, (Shearsman Books, January 2013) 
 Not So Ill With You and Me poetry, (Shearsman Books, May 2015) 
 The Purloined Letter, (Shearsman Books, coming in 2017)

Translations 
Cuando Dijiste No Querías Decir Nunca (Bartleby Editores, 2015)

References

External links 
Poetic Virtues by David Orr August 23, 2013. The New York Times.
No Need to Argue Anymore by Fani Papageorgiou
The Man in Chamonix by Fani Papageorgiou
On the rocks by Fani Papageorgiou
Heat goes to cold by Fani Papageorgiou
A journal called Bob by Fani Papageorgiou
Conduct Books by Fani Papageorgiou

1975 births
Living people
Harvard University alumni
Alumni of the University of Edinburgh